Pāvels Koļcovs (born 1 September 1982) is a Latvian football defender, currently playing for BFC Daugava in the Latvian First League.

He previously played for Dinaburg FC but after the club's relegation from Virsliga, he became an unrestricted free agent and joined FC Daugava.

In July 2010 he left Daugava, signing for FK Jaunība from Riga, after the season he was released. In April 2011 he joined Virsliga newcomers FC Jūrmala, but was released in July and joined BFC Daugava. Before the start of the 2012 season Koļcovs moved to the Latvian First League newcomers Ilūkstes NSS. He played 21 matches for them, scoring 2 goals, helping his team clinch a promotion to the Latvian Higher League. He left the team after the 2012 season to join the Latvian First League club BFC Daugava.

Koļcovs had a brief spell with FC Metallurg-Kuzbass Novokuznetsk in the Russian First Division during the 2003 season.

Playing career

* – played games and goals

References

1982 births
Living people
Sportspeople from Daugavpils
Latvian footballers
Dinaburg FC players
Latvian expatriate footballers
Expatriate footballers in Russia
Latvian expatriate sportspeople in Russia
FC Jūrmala players
Association football defenders
Ilūkstes NSS players
FC Novokuznetsk players